3 Way is the first extended play (EP) by American hip hop group Migos. It was released on July 7, 2016, by Quality Control Music and YRN tha Label. The EP features a single guest appearance from Blac Youngsta. The EPs production is handled by Zaytoven, Cassius Jay, Dun Deal and Ricky Racks.

Critical reception

3 Way received generally positive reviews. Kathy Iaondoli from Pitchfork gave it a 3 Way score of 6.5 out of 10 and wrote: 
Site HipHopDX.com gave it 3.5 of 5.

Track listing

References

2016 debut EPs
Migos albums
Albums produced by Ricky Racks
Albums produced by Zaytoven
Quality Control Music albums